Paul Nikola Spoljaric (born September 24, 1970) is a Canadian former left-handed professional baseball pitcher. He played  in Major League Baseball (MLB) for four different teams between 1994 and 2000.

Biography

After being signed by the Toronto Blue Jays as an amateur free agent in 1989, Spoljaric went on to play for the Toronto Blue Jays (two stints), Seattle Mariners, Philadelphia Phillies and Kansas City Royals. He was traded in 1997 with Mike Timlin for José Cruz Jr. and was a member of Team Canada at the 2004 Summer Olympics, where they finished in fourth place in the baseball tournament.

In his six-year MLB career, Spoljaric compiled an 8–17 record with 278 strikeouts, 12 saves, and a 5.52 ERA in 278 innings.

Spoljaric was a starting pitcher with the Barrie Baycats of the Intercounty Baseball League (IBL) in Southern Ontario. He signed with them in December 2007 and was a starting pitcher for the 2008 IBL season. Spoljaric also spent the previous six IBL seasons as a starting pitcher with the Toronto Maple Leafs. With the Maple Leafs, he won two IBL championships, in 2002 and 2007.

After leaving baseball, Spoljaric became president of a flooring company based in Bolton, Ontario. His son, Garner, played college baseball for Stetson.

References

External links
, or Pelota Binaria (Venezuelan Winter League)
 Paul Spoljaric at Olympics Sports Reference via Wayback Machine

1970 births
Living people
Akron Aeros players
Baseball people from British Columbia
Baseball players at the 2004 Summer Olympics
Buffalo Bisons (minor league) players
Canadian expatriate baseball players in the United States
Canadian people of Croatian descent
Cardenales de Lara players
Canadian expatriate baseball players in Venezuela
Dunedin Blue Jays players
Kansas City Royals players
Knoxville Smokies players
Major League Baseball pitchers
Major League Baseball players from Canada
Medicine Hat Blue Jays players
Myrtle Beach Hurricanes players
Olympic baseball players of Canada
Omaha Golden Spikes players
Philadelphia Phillies players
Seattle Mariners players
Sportspeople from Kelowna
St. Catharines Blue Jays players
St. Catharines Stompers players
Syracuse Chiefs players
Toronto Blue Jays players